Heiligenkreuz, which means 'Holy Cross' in German, may refer to:

In Austria:
Heiligenkreuz, Lower Austria, a municipality in Lower Austria
Heiligenkreuz Abbey in this municipality 
Heiligenkreuz im Lafnitztal, a municipality in Burgenland
Heiligenkreuz am Waasen, a municipality in Styria

In the Czech Republic:
Chodský Újezd, a municipality in the Czech Republic

In Slovakia:
Žiar nad Hronom, a town in Slovakia

In Slovenia:
Beli Grič, a settlement in the Municipality of Mokronog–Trebelno, formerly known as Heiligenkreuz
Podbočje, a settlement in the Municipality of Krško, formerly known as Heiligenkreuz